sarngpur may refer to:
 
 Sarangpur, Madhya Pradesh, a municipality in India
 Sarangpur (Vidhan Sabha constituency), Madhya Pradesh
 Sarangpur, Agra, a village in Uttar Pradesh, India
 an alternative spelling of Salangpur, a town in Gujarat, India

See also
 Sarangapur (disambiguation)